Bethalto is a village in Madison County, Illinois, United States. Bethalto, like the rest of Madison County, is part of the Illinois Metro East portion of the Greater St. Louis metropolitan area.

Early in its history, the village was a railway town along the Terre Haute and Alton Railroad. In the 19th century, industry in the town included milling of grain from local farms and coal mining. In the early 20th century, the railroad was rerouted to go through nearby Edwardsville. By the mid 20th century, the rail industry had pulled out entirely and the village became known as a bedroom town.

At the 2020 census, the population of Bethalto was 9,310.

History

Toponymy 
The name "Bethalto" is commonly believed to be derived from Bethel (the original name of the town) and nearby Alton. The name "Bethel" came from the first church located in the area, with the Post Office Department requiring it to change its name to avoid confusion with the Clay County village of Bethel.

Early history 
Before pioneering American settlers arrived, there were numerous Native Americans in the area, and Kickapoo villages lined nearby Indian Creek. In 1804, a man named Thomas Rattan arrived in the area from Ohio and established the first pioneer settlement, often referred to in those days as "Rattan's Prairie". The town was laid out by Joel U. Starkey, with the town plat being recorded June 23, 1854.

Milling industry 
In the late 1800s, the principal industry of Bethalto was milling. In 1859, the President Mill and Elevator Company was established by James Neimrich. The company was bought, sold and expanded various times over the years, eventually coming into the ownership of John W. Kaufman in 1881. In either 1895 or 1896, the flour mill was destroyed in a fire. Kauffman declined to rebuild the mill, instead opting to purchase the Eagle flour mill of St. Louis. The loss of the mill had a profound impact on the village. In 1890, the population of Bethalto was 879. By 1900, it had fallen to 477 and in 1910 the population of the village was just 447.

1996 plane crash 
On June 19, 1996, a McDonnell Douglas F/A-18 Hornet crashed into a home, shortly after taking off from St. Louis Regional Airport. The plane originally belonged to the US Navy, but had been leased back to the manufacturer, McDonnell Douglas. A spokesperson for McDonnell Douglass said the pilot had been practicing for an air show the next week in the Czech Republic. One eyewitness stated, "He started doing an outside roll ... and when he got to the top of the roll something went wrong; he stalled or something. He started coming down, and I lost him behind some trees. Then I heard a thump―not an explosion, just a loud thump―and I knew what'd happened."

Red Barn 
A longtime landmark just north of Bethalto was an old barn at the intersection of Culp Lane and Bethalto Road, known to residents as simply "the red barn". On July 26, 2012, the owner of the barn was spraying insecticides inside the barn to kill wasps. After spraying for wasps, the owner left and at some point a fire broke out. Fosterburg, Bethalto and Brighton volunteer fire departments responded to the blaze, but it was too late to save the structure. It was believed the barn had been there for around a hundred years. Often, residents would give directions based on the red barn.

Governance 
Bethalto was incorporated in 1869 under a special charter, and later incorporated again in 1873 under Illinois general law. The village is governed by an elected village president and a board of village trustees, who are elected at-large.

Geography 

Bethalto is located in northwestern Madison County at  (38.904197, -90.046579).

Most of the village drains west to the East Fork of the Wood River, a southwest-flowing direct tributary of the Mississippi River. The east part of the village drains east to Indian Creek, a south-flowing tributary of Cahokia Creek, which joins the Mississippi in Hartford.

Demographics 

As of the census of 2000, there were 9,454 people, 3,810 households, and 2,647 families residing in the village. The racial makeup of the village was 97.84% White, 0.76% African American, 0.22% Native American, 0.40% Asian, 0.33% from other races, and 0.44% from two or more races. Hispanic or Latino of any race were 1.00% of the population.

There were 3,810 households, out of which 34.1% had children under the age of 18 living with them, 54.2% were married couples living together, 11.7% had a female householder with no husband present, and 30.5% were non-families. 26.8% of all households were made up of individuals, and 12.5% had someone living alone who was 65 years of age or older.  The average household size was 2.46 and the average family size was 2.98.

In the village, the population was spread out, with 25.7% under the age of 18, 8.5% from 18 to 24, 28.7% from 25 to 44, 22.9% from 45 to 64, and 14.1% who were 65 years of age or older.  The median age was 37 years. For every 100 females, there were 91.3 males.  For every 100 females age 18 and over, there were 85.0 males.

The median income for a household in the village was $42,201, and the median income for a family was $50,764. Males had a median income of $41,512 versus $22,981 for females. The per capita income for the village was $18,697.  About 6.5% of families and 9.2% of the population were below the poverty line, including 13.1% of those under age 18 and 6.4% of those age 65 or over.

Transportation

Highways 
Bethalto is connected to the region by several routes. Illinois Route 140 is the main east-west highway running through the village, leading east  to Hamel and west  to Alton. Illinois Route 111 joins with Illinois Route 140 from the south, connecting the village to the rest of the Metro East. It leads south  to Wood River and west  to the northern part of Alton. In October 2006, Illinois Route 255, a four-lane, controlled-access highway, was extended from Illinois Route 143 in Wood River to Fosterburg Road, passing through the west side of Bethalto. IL 255 leads south  to Interstate 255 in Pontoon Beach, Illinois, connecting Bethalto to the Interstate Highway System, and now leads northwest  to U.S. Route 67 in Godfrey.

St. Louis Regional Airport 

Bethalto is home to St. Louis Regional Airport. Originally called Civic Memorial Airport, St. Louis Regional was founded in 1946 with a ballot measure approving the creation of the Civic Memorial Airport Authority. The airport is home to various services, including West Star Aviation, a fixed-base operator.

Education 
Public schools in Bethalto are operated by Bethalto Community Unit School District 8, which was founded in 1950 along with Civic Memorial High School. The village is also home to Our Lady Queen of Peace, a Catholic school founded in 1962 under Father Thomas Manning, and a Lutheran school also founded in 1962, Zion Lutheran. Both parochial schools offer kindergarten through eighth grade classes.

Religious organizations 
Bethalto is home to a number of religious organizations, consisting of both small and large congregations.

Churches that serve Bethalto are listed here in alphabetical order:

Assembly of God
Bethalto United Methodist
Bethalto United Presbyterian
Bible Baptist Church
Church of God
Church of the Nazarene (IL District Office)
Cornerstone Church
Concordia Lutheran
Cottage Hills Baptist Church
First Baptist Church
First Church of God
First Christian Church
First Southern Baptist Church
Grace Community Church
Heart's Harvest
Landmark Worship Center
Lifebrook Church
Meadowbrook Assembly of God
Metro Presbyterian Church
Our Lady Queen of Peace
Riverbend Calvary Chapel
Skyline Church - Bethalto Campus
St. Paul's United Methodist
Zion Lutheran

Parks and recreation

Central Park 
Central Park is in the center of the village, behind the current village hall, and sits on  acres of land purchased from New York Central Railroad when the rail line closed in Bethalto. The park consists of a walking path, band stand, lighted tennis courts, baseball fields, and a basketball court. The Bethalto Homecoming is held at the park every year.

Bethalto Arboretum 
Adjacent to Central Park is the Bethalto Arboretum. This arboretum was developed in 1966 on former railroad property, much like Central Park. A directory of trees and bushes contained in the arboretum may be viewed in the mayor's and clerk's offices. There are also many plaques, in memory of Bethalto's notable persons, placed next to many of the trees in the park. A set of rail wheels on top of a short slab of railroad track lie in the center of the park. The short piece of track remains in its original position as part of the old railroad tracks that existed to transport coal to and from the area. In April 2021, the arboretum was recognized with ArbNet accreditation. A time capsule was buried at the dedication ceremony, and a commemorative plaque sits at the entrance.

Steve Bryant Park 
Known as "Culp Lane Park" until 2014, Bryant Park is on the northwest end of town. Features include a fishing lake, a children's play area, walking paths, pavilions, a playground, and stretches of attractive landscaping. The park was named for former mayor Steve Bryant, who was instrumental in transforming the town lagoon into a family park.

Bethalto Sports Complex 
The Bethalto Sports Complex is located on the north side of town just off Culp Lane. The complex was completed in 2006 and is made up of two baseball fields, two softball fields, two soccer fields, a grandstand, and a concession stand. The complex, which is maintained by the Village of Bethalto, replaced the old baseball and soccer fields located at Civic Memorial High School for varsity and junior varsity baseball, softball and soccer teams. The Indians, the Bethalto Legion team, also calls the complex home.

Southside Park 
Southside Park (sometimes referred to as the "Field of Dreams") is located on the south side of town in the Chateaux residential area. The complex consists of four lighted diamonds with a concession stand in the center. The fields are primarily set up to handle all of the local Boys & Girls Clubs of America youth baseball and softball games. The fields are also home to a number of private and select league baseball teams that play there every summer.

Notable people 
 Steve Davis (born 1949), former representative in the Illinois General Assembly
 Alison Krauss, bluegrass-country singer and musician, often rehearsed in Bethalto with Mike Harman and the Harman Family Bluegrass Band. Mike Harman was an original member of Union Station.
 Joe Odom (born 1979), American football player for the Chicago Bears
 Wilbur Trimpe (1906-1996), first superintendent of Bethalto Community Unit School District 8, third president of Lewis and Clark Community College

References 

Bibliography

External links
 
His Story of Bethalto - Henry W. Zimmermann
St. Louis Regional Airport

1834 establishments in Illinois
Populated places established in 1834
Villages in Madison County, Illinois
Villages in Illinois